Jefferson Township is a township in Jefferson County, Kansas, USA.  As of the 2000 census, its population was 1,240.

Geography
Jefferson Township covers an area of 58.25 square miles (150.87 square kilometers); of this, 0.14 square miles (0.36 square kilometers) or 0.24 percent is water. The stream of Indian Creek runs through this township.

Cities and towns
 Winchester

Unincorporated towns
 Boyle
 Dunavant
(This list is based on USGS data and may include former settlements.)

Adjacent townships
 Easton Township, Leavenworth County (east)
 Alexandria Township, Leavenworth County (southeast)
 Union Township (south)
 Oskaloosa Township (southwest)
 Ozawkie Township (southwest)
 Delaware Township (west)
 Norton Township (northwest)

Cemeteries
The township contains three cemeteries: Hulls Grove, Spring Grove and Wise.

Major highways
 U.S. Route 59
 K-16
 K-192

References
 U.S. Board on Geographic Names (GNIS)
 United States Census Bureau cartographic boundary files

External links
 US-Counties.com
 City-Data.com

Townships in Jefferson County, Kansas
Townships in Kansas